Bullion coins are government-minted, legal tender coins made of precious metals, such as gold, palladium, platinum, rhodium, and silver. They are kept as a store of value or an investment rather than used in day-to-day commerce.

Under United Kingdom law, a bullion coin may be marketed as a coin if it is minted after 1800, is at least 900 thousandths fine, and are (or have been) legal tender in their country of origin. Under United States law, coins that do not meet the legal tender requirement cannot be marketed as "coins". Instead, they must be advertised as rounds.

Bullion coins are typically available in various weights, usually multiples or fractions of 1 troy ounce, but some bullion coins are produced in very limited quantities in kilograms or heavier.

Gold

Palladium

Platinum

Rhodium

Silver

Annual releases

Limited series

Gallery

References

Bullion coins